Little Ethiopia is a neighborhood in the central region of Los Angeles. It is known for its collection of  Ethiopian restaurants, coffee shops, boutiques and thrift stores.

History

The neighborhood of Little Ethiopia dates back to the early 1990s. The area has a high concentration of Ethiopian businesses and restaurants, as well as a significant concentration of residents of Ethiopian and Eritrean ancestry.

In the 1990s, the neighborhood was  called "Little Addis", referring to Ethiopia's capital, Addis Ababa.   In 2002, the city officially bestowed the name "Little Ethiopia" on the neighborhood. By 2006, there were 15 Ethiopian businesses in the neighborhood, including restaurants, markets, a clothing store, a hair salon and a travel agency.

Geography
Little Ethiopia is located on Fairfax Avenue between Olympic Boulevard and Whitworth Drive.
The neighborhood of Carthay Square is west and Wilshire Vista is east. Faircrest Heights is southwest, Picfair Village is southeast and Miracle Mile is northeast.

Landmarks and attractions 
 The Little Ethiopia Cultural and Resource Center - 1045 South Fairfax Avenue.
 Hansen's Cakes - 1060 S Fairfax Ave

References

African culture in California
Ethiopian-American history
Ethnic enclaves in California
Neighborhoods in Los Angeles
Wilshire, Los Angeles